Mangamma Sabadham is a 1985 Indian Tamil-language masala film, directed by K. Vijayan and produced by K. Balaji, starring Kamal Haasan, Sujatha, Madhavi and Sathyaraj. It is a remake of the 1984 Hindi film Kasam Paida Karne Wale Ki. The film was released on 21 September 1985.

Plot 

Ashok is raised to be a stuttering, frightened coward by his cruel uncle Bhoopathy. When Mangamma and her cohorts learn that he is unmarried, she works her way into his mother's heart and marries him. But when she learns about his ill-treatment at the hands of his uncle, his plight changes her heart and she decides to stay on. But Bhoopathy reveals her initial plan of absconding with the money and drives her out. When Ashok runs to join her, Bhoopathy kills him. Mangamma is thought to be dead but she survives and raises her son Raja to be a fearless young man well-versed in fighting, dancing, etc. Once he learns the story, he, along with his girlfriend Radha, settles scores with Bhoopathy and his son Jaipal.

Cast 
 Kamal Haasan as Ashok and Raja
 Sujatha as Mangamma
 Madhavi as Radha
 Sathyaraj as Boopathy
 Balan K. Nair
 Sukumari
 Manorama
Nalinikanth as Jaipal
Bindu Ghosh

Soundtrack 
The music was composed by Shankar–Ganesh and the lyrics were written by Vaali and Pulamaipithan.

Reception 
Jayamanmadhan of Kalki appreciated the film for Haasan and Sathyaraj's performances. The film was dubbed in Malayalam as Randum Randum Anju, released in 1985.

References

External links 
 

1980s masala films
1980s Tamil-language films
1985 films
Films directed by K. Vijayan
Films scored by Shankar–Ganesh
Indian films about revenge
Tamil remakes of Hindi films